Pilas is a district of the Buenos Aires canton, in the Puntarenas province of Costa Rica.

History 
Pilas was created on 20 January 1968 by Decreto 7. Segregated from Buenos Aires.

Geography 
Pilas has an area of  km² and an elevation of  metres.

Demographics 

For the 2011 census, Pilas had a population of  inhabitants.

References 

Districts of Puntarenas Province
Populated places in Puntarenas Province